The 2000 Currie Cup was the 62nd season of the Currie Cup, South Africa's premier domestic rugby union competition, since it started in 1889. The competition was known as the Bankfin Currie Cup for sponsorship reasons and was contested from 21 July to 28 October 2000.

The top eight sides from an initial qualification stage competed for the premier Currie Cup, while the bottom six sides from the qualification stage competed for the secondary Bankfin Cup.

Competition rules and information

There were fourteen participating teams in the 2000 Currie Cup, all of them starting the season in the 2000 Currie Cup qualification stage. At this stage, the teams were divided into two sections (Section X and Section Y) and played all the other teams in their section once, either home or away.

The top four teams from both sections qualified to the 2000 Currie Cup Top 8 stage, carrying forward the results they got against their three fellow qualifiers. In the Top 8, they then faced all the teams from the opposite section once, either home and away.

The bottom three teams from both qualification sections qualified to the 2000 Bankfin Cup stage, carrying forward the results they got against their two fellow qualifiers. In the Bankfin Cup, they then faced all the teams from the opposite section once, either home and away.

In all three stages of the competition, teams received four points for a win and two points for a draw. Bonus points were awarded to teams that scored four or more tries in a game, as well as to teams that lost a match by seven points or less. Teams were ranked by log points, then points difference (points scored less points conceded).

At the end of the Top 8 and Bankfin Cup stages, the top four teams qualified for the title play-offs. In the semi-finals, the team that finished first had home advantage against the team that finished fourth, while the team that finished second had home advantage against the team that finished third. The winners of these semi-finals advanced to the final, at the home venue of the higher-placed team.

Teams

Team Listing

Changes from 1999

Rather than the single division used in 1999, the 2000 Currie Cup competition was divided into two stages: an initial qualification stage took place, followed by two second-stage competitions: the Currie Cup for the top eight teams from the qualification stage and the Bankfin Cup for the bottom six teams.

There was a name change prior to this season:
  were renamed the

Qualification

Top 8

After winning their respective semi-finals, the Natal Sharks and Western Province played in the final, which Western Province won 25–15 in Durban.

Bankfin Cup

After winning their respective semi-finals, the Blue Bulls and Mighty Elephants played in the final, which the Blue Bulls won 41–20 in Port Elizabeth.

Honours

The honour roll for the 2000 Currie Cup was:

References

 
2000 in South African rugby union
2000 rugby union tournaments for clubs